Youlthorpe is a hamlet in the East Riding of Yorkshire, England. It forms part of the civil parish of Bishop Wilton.

From 1886 Youlthorpe was part of the civil parish of Youlthorpe with Gowthorpe which was abolished on 1 April 1935 with the creation of the civil parish of Bishop Wilton.

East farmhouse in the settlement was designated a Grade II listed building in 1987 and is now recorded in the National Heritage List for England, maintained by Historic England.

References

External links

Villages in the East Riding of Yorkshire